The Martha Mitchell Effect is an American Netflix original documentary film directed by Anne Alvergue and Debra McClutchy. The film was released on June 17, 2022.

Summary
Told through archival footage, its story is centered around Watergate whistleblower Martha Mitchell, a cabinet wife who was gaslit by the Nixon administration in an attempt to keep her silent.

Accolades
It is nominated for Best Documentary Short Film at the 95th Academy Awards.

Reception
On the review aggregator website Rotten Tomatoes, the film has a positive review of 100% based on 5 critics' reviews.

References

External links

Official trailer

2022 films
2022 short documentary films
2020s English-language films
2020s American films
Netflix original documentary films
Documentary films about American politicians
American short documentary films
Watergate scandal in film
Collage film
Films set in the 1970s
Documentary films about women